is a Japanese politician. As of 2008 he is a member of the House of Representatives (lower house) currently serving in his eighth term representing Fukuoka's Third District. He is a member of the Liberal Democratic Party (LDP) in the Koga faction. Kiyoko Fukuda, who married Prime Minister of Japan Yasuo Fukuda, is his cousin.

Career 
Before entering politics, Ota was an economics professor.  He then served as chief of the Management and Coordination Agency.

Ota entered politics in 1980 with the help of his father-in-law, the governor of Fukuoka.  He has since been involved mainly in economic policy.  Under Noboru Takeshita in the late 1980s, he advocated the introduction of the consumption tax. Ota also participated in changes in the Commercial Law in the late 1990s and realignment of government ministries and agencies in 2001. Ota left the LDP in 1994 to form a small party, but returned to the LDP the following year.

Igniting more controversy after the Super Free rape scandal was revealed, on 26 June 2003 Ota said "At least gang rapists are still vigorous. Isn't that at least a little closer to normal?" This shocked Japan and Mizuho Fukushima criticized him.

During the debate of terrorism in January 2008, he claimed that Fukushima was an "ultra-leftist".

On August 1, 2008, Yasuo Fukuda named Ota as the Minister of Agriculture, Forestry and Fisheries in the cabinet list. He stated: "I met with Prime Minister Fukuda and told him my decision to resign, considering the seriousness of the tainted rice problem for the society." Yasuo Fukuda accepted the resignation. Ota was informed of the problem in January 2007 but said he saw no need to make "too much of a fuss over it". The rice, tainted with pesticide methamidophos and mould, was for industrial uses only, but was resold, used and served to make lunches for thousands of schoolchildren and nursing home patients.

References

External links 
 Fury over Japan rape gaffe BBC News
  Ōta Seiichi Official Web Site

1945 births
Living people
People from Fukuoka
Keio University alumni
Members of the House of Representatives (Japan)
Ministers of Agriculture, Forestry and Fisheries of Japan
Liberal Democratic Party (Japan) politicians
21st-century Japanese politicians